Venuto is a surname. Notable people with the surname include:

 Michael Di Venuto (born 1973), Australia cricketer
 Sam Venuto (born 1927), former American football running back

See also

 Venuta
 Venuti
 Benvenuto (disambiguation)
 Benvenuta (disambiguation)